Leitir N.S. (also known as St. Joseph's N.S.) was an Irish Catholic primary school located in Leitir, Islandeady, Castlebar, County Mayo, Ireland.

The original school opened in 1889, the new school opened in 1962. The school closed permanently on 28 June 2019.

Notable alumni  
 Enda Kenny, former Taoiseach of Ireland (2011–2017), and Leader of Fine Gael (2002–2017)
 Henry Kenny, Fine Gael politician and Gaelic footballer (teacher) 
 Henry Kenny Jr., Fine Gael politician
 Ray Moylette, professional boxer

See also

 Education in the Republic of Ireland

References

Catholic primary schools in the Republic of Ireland
Defunct Catholic schools in Ireland
1889 establishments in Ireland
Educational institutions established in 1889
2019 disestablishments in Ireland
Educational institutions disestablished in 2019